In shogi, the Pac-Man (パックマン pakkuman or 4四歩パックマン yon-yon-fu pakkuman) is a trap opening.

It is named after the video game Pac-Man. 

The opening was called 4四歩パックリ yon-yon-fu pakkuri on the NHK shogi television show Shogi Focus (将棋フォーカス).

The opening has an early pawn gambit made by White on the fourth file which may be metaphorically eaten by Black's bishop as if by Pac-Man. If Black takes the pawn with their bishop without careful thought, then the trap may succeed.

Six professional shogi players – Yoshiharu Habu, Yasumitsu Satō, Toshiyuki Moriuchi, Kōji Tanigawa, Akira Watanabe, Takeshi Fujii – agreed that the opening puts White at a disadvantage.

Development

Main line

Double Pac-Man

Rook promotion line

References

Bibliography

External links

 YouTube HIDETCHI: Shogi Openings: Pac-Man

Shogi openings
Shogi surprise openings
Ranging Rook openings
Fourth File Rook openings